Francisco Pérez is a paralympic athlete from Spain competing mainly in category T11 distance running events.

Francisco competed in the 1996 Summer Paralympics in Atlanta. He finished fourth in the 10,000m and won a bronze medal in the marathon.

References

External links
 

Paralympic athletes of Spain
Athletes (track and field) at the 1996 Summer Paralympics
Paralympic bronze medalists for Spain
Living people
Medalists at the 1996 Summer Paralympics
Place of birth missing (living people)
Year of birth missing (living people)
Paralympic medalists in athletics (track and field)
Spanish male long-distance runners
Spanish male marathon runners
Visually impaired long-distance runners
Visually impaired marathon runners
Paralympic long-distance runners
Paralympic marathon runners